The 2021 Watford Borough Council election took place on 6 May 2021 to elect members of Watford Borough Council in England. This was the same day as other local elections.

Results summary

Ward results

Callowland

Central

Holywell

Leggatts

Meriden

Nascot

Oxhey

Park

Stanborough

Tudor

Vicarage

Woodside

References

Watford
Watford Borough Council elections
2020s in Hertfordshire
May 2021 events in the United Kingdom